Dark Shadows: Echoes of Insanity is a Big Finish Productions original dramatic reading based on the long-running American horror soap opera series Dark Shadows.

Plot 
Willie Loomis has been locked up in the Windcliff Institute. He is visited by an angel who forces him to face up to his past...

Cast
Willie Loomis – John Karlen
Angelique Bouchard Collins – Lara Parker

External links
Dark Shadows - Echoes of Insanity

Dark Shadows audio plays
2009 audio plays